Olatokunbo Susan Olasobunmi Abeke "Toks" Olagundoye  (born 16 September 1975)  is a Nigerian actress. She is known for her role as Hayley Shipton in Castle, Jackie Joyner-Kersee in the ABC TV sitcom The Neighbors, and Mel Medarda in the animated Netflix series Arcane.

Early life
Olatokunbo Susan Olasobunmi Abeke Olagundoye was born on 16 September 1975 in Lagos, Nigeria, to a Nigerian father and a Norwegian mother. As a youth, she was educated in Nigeria, Switzerland, and England. She received a Bachelor of Fine Arts in theatre from Smith College.

Career
Olagundoye made her screen debuts on both TV and the big screen in 2002; in an episode of the television series The Education of Max Bickford; and in the film Brown Sugar  later that same year. She appeared opposite Ruby Dee in an off-Broadway production Saint Lucy's Eyes in April 2001, and in 2005 she cofounded the theater company Three Chicks Theatre, which produced Andrea Lepcio's One Nation Under in 2008. Olagundoye has guest-starred on Ugly Betty, Law & Order, CSI: NY, Switched at Birth, NCIS: Naval Criminal Investigative Service and Prime Suspect. Her film credits include A Beautiful Soul, Come Back to Me, Absolute Trust and The Salon.

In 2012 Olagundoye was cast as a series regular in the ABC comedy series The Neighbors, playing the part of Jackie Joyner-Kersee until the series was canceled after two seasons in 2014. She later had starring roles in the two television pilots: Feed Me, opposite Mary-Louise Parker for NBC; and Amazon's Salem Rogers, co-starring with Leslie Bibb. Olagundoye joined the cast of ABC comedy-drama Castle in 2015 as a series regular in the role of Hayley Shipton.

From 2017 to 2021, she voiced Bentina Beakley for the 2017 reboot of DuckTales. In 2019 Olagundoye had a recurring role on the final season of Veep playing Senator Kemi Talbot. Olagundoye does the voice acting for Mel Medarda in Arcane: League of Legends (2021). In 2021, she had a recurring role on the ABC series The Rookie, and in 2022 was cast as one of leads in ABC revival of L.A. Law.

Personal life
On May 16, 2015, Olagundoye married Sean Quinn, whom she met on Twitter, after several years of dating. They have a son together.

Filmography

Film

Television

Video games

See also 

 List of Yoruba people
 List of Nigerian actresses

References

External links

Twitter account

1975 births
Living people
20th-century Nigerian actresses
21st-century Nigerian actresses
Actresses from Lagos
Nigerian expatriate actresses in the United States
Nigerian film actresses
Nigerian people of Norwegian descent
Nigerian television actresses
Nigerian video game actresses
Nigerian voice actresses
Smith College alumni
Yoruba actresses
Actors in Yoruba cinema